I Kinda Like Me is the ninth album by Gloria Gaynor. It failed to make an impact because of the then current, now defunct Disco backlash. Includes the single, "Let's Mend What's Been Broken." "I Love You Cause" was dedicated to her then husband and manager, Linwood M. Simon.

This album was reissued on CD in Japan by Polydor (POCP-2182).

Track listing

Personnel
Gloria Gaynor - lead vocals
Dennis Harris, Eddie Sierra, Roland Chambers - guitar
Jimmy Williams - bass guitar
Jerry Cohen - keyboards, synthesizer
Keith Benson - drums
Daryl Burgee - bongos
Sam Peake - saxophone, horn arrangements
Don Renaldo - string arrangements
Barbara Ingram, Carla Benson, Evette Benton - backing vocals
Technical
Dirk Devlin - engineer
Robert L. Heimall - art direction
Anthony Barboza - photography

References

External links
 

1981 albums
Gloria Gaynor albums
Polydor Records albums
albums recorded at Sigma Sound Studios